Zoran Bojović (Cyrillic: Зоран Бојовић; born 26 November 1956) is a Yugoslav retired professional footballer who played as a midfielder.

Playing career

International
Bojović made his debut for Yugoslavia in an October 1983 European Championship qualification match against Norway and earned a total of 2 caps, scoring no goals. His second and final international was a friendly match, two weeks after his debut, against Switzerland.

Managerial career
He extended his contract as manager of Belgian lower league side UR Namur in March 2020.

Personal life 
His son Petar (born in 1984) is also Professional footballer, mainly in Belgium with a short period in China

References

External links
 
 
 

1956 births
Living people
People from Berane
Association football midfielders
Yugoslav footballers
Yugoslavia international footballers
FK Mogren players
FK FAP players
FK Radnički Niš players
Cercle Brugge K.S.V. players
Standard Liège players
FC Mulhouse players
St. Louis Storm players
Union Royale Namur Fosses-La-Ville players
Montenegrin Republic League players
Yugoslav First League players
Belgian Pro League players
Ligue 2 players
Major Indoor Soccer League (1978–1992) players
Belgian Third Division players
Yugoslav expatriate footballers
Expatriate footballers in Belgium
Yugoslav expatriate sportspeople in Belgium
Expatriate footballers in France
Yugoslav expatriate sportspeople in France
Expatriate soccer players in the United States
Yugoslav expatriate sportspeople in the United States
Montenegrin football managers
Expatriate football managers in Belgium